Yuraq Mach'ay (Quechua yuraq white, mach'ay cave, "white cave", Hispanicized spelling Yurac Machay) is a mountain in the Chunta mountain range in the Andes of Peru, about  high. It is located in the Huancavelica Region, Huancavelica Province, Huacocolpa District. Yuraq Mach'ay lies north of Yana Urqu.

References

Mountains of Huancavelica Region
Mountains of Peru